Joseph Schmitt (April 6, 1882 – July 23, 1967) was a German politician of the Christian Democratic Union (CDU) and former member of the German Bundestag.

Life 
He was a member of the first German Bundestag from 1949 to 1953, where he was elected to the Christian Democratic Union of Germany (CDU) as direct candidate for the Mainz constituency.

Literature

References

1882 births
1967 deaths
Members of the Bundestag for Rhineland-Palatinate
Members of the Bundestag 1949–1953
Members of the Bundestag for the Christian Democratic Union of Germany